Makenna Kelly (born ) is an American social media influencer. She began her career doing ASMR videos on YouTube.

Career
Kelly created her channel in March 2018.

Kelly was part of the class of 2018 for Teen Vogue's "21 Under 21".

Kelly currently partners with the fast fashion brand Shein doing haul videos with the company's products. She receives a flat fee for her work and free clothing as compensation.

Personal life
Kelly lives in Fort Collins, Colorado.

References

External links
 
 

Living people
People from Fort Collins, Colorado
American YouTubers
Fashion YouTubers
2000s births